Richard Dudley may refer to:

 Richard M. Dudley (1938–2020), professor of mathematics
 Richard Houston Dudley (1836–1914), American politician, Confederate soldier and businessman
 Dick Dudley (1915–2000), American radio and television announcer